Simon Rosenthal (November 13, 1903 – April 7, 1969) was an outfielder in Major League Baseball who played from  through  for the Boston Red Sox.

Biography
He was born in Boston, Massachusetts. He was Jewish, and was the first Jewish player on the Red Sox.

 
In a two-season career, Rosenthal was a .266 hitter (95-for-357) with four home runs and 42 RBI in 123 games, including 40 runs, 17 doubles, five triples, five stolen bases and a .319 on-base percentage. His big league career was hampered by a foot injury from his time in the minor leagues; Rosenthal played professional baseball until 1935, but never again reached the major leagues.

Both Sy and his son Buddy (Irwin Rosenthal) joined to fight in World War II. The elder Rosenthal was initially rejected due to loose cartilage in his knee dating back to baseball days. After being rejected, he paid for knee surgery to have the cartilage removed and had some expensive dental work done so he could pass the fitness tests, and he ultimately made the cut in spite of his age.

Both Rosenthals suffered great tragedy during the war. Buddy was killed in the Pacific Ocean on Christmas Day 1943, at just 17 years old. Sy was rendered paraplegic on September 25, 1944, when his ship hit a German mine off the coast of France.

Rosenthal had liquidated his businesses in order to pay for his pre-war medical procedures, so the Red Sox held a "Sy Rosenthal Day" on September 13, 1947, to raise money for his care. He remained active in a number of charitable causes throughout his life. Rosenthal died at the age of 65 in his hometown of Boston.

See also
1925 Boston Red Sox season
1926 Boston Red Sox season

References

External links
Baseball Reference
Retrosheet
Society for American Baseball Research
Jewish Baseball Museum
Si Rosenthal, Hero

1903 births
1969 deaths
Boston Red Sox players
Major League Baseball outfielders
Baseball players from Massachusetts
Jewish American baseball players
Jewish Major League Baseball players
People with paraplegia
United States Navy sailors
American disabled sportspeople
United States Navy personnel of World War II
Baseball players with disabilities
20th-century American Jews